The Cork-Limerick rivalry is a Gaelic football rivalry between Irish county teams Cork and Limerick, who first played each other in 1894. It is a rivalry that has been dominated by Cork. Cork's home ground is Páirc Uí Chaoimh and Limerick's home ground is the Gaelic Grounds.

While Cork have 37 Munster titles and Limerick have just one provincial triumph, they have also enjoyed success in the All-Ireland Senior Football Championship, having won 9 championship titles between them to date.

All-time results

Legend

Senior

References

Limerick
Limerick county football team rivalries